10 South American nations took part in the 2010–12 Continental Beach Volleyball Cup.  In the sub-zonal round each nation was paired off with another with the winner advancing to the zonal round.  In the zonal round the five nations played a round robin with the top four advancing to the continental cup final.  In the continental cup final was played in a round robin format.  The winner will qualify a team to the 2012 Summer Olympics while second and third advance to the final olympic qualification tournament.

Men

Sub-Zonal

Zonal

Host: Santiago, Chile
Dates: November 24–27, 2011

 Brazil took second over Chile because they had a better set average.

Continental Cup Final

Final

Venue
 

The Final will be contested between Chile and Venezuela.

Women

Sub-Zonal

Zonal

Host: Guatape, Colombia
Dates: December 7–11, 2011

 Uruguay took third, Venezuela took fourth and Colombia took fifth because of set ratio.

Continental Cup Final

References

O
O
O
Continental Beach Volleyball Cup